Caldwell County Courthouse may refer to:

Caldwell County Courthouse (Missouri), Kingston, Missouri
Caldwell County Courthouse (North Carolina), Lenoir, North Carolina
Caldwell County Courthouse (Texas), Lockhart, Texas
Caldwell County Courthouse Historic District